Diamond Mine is the second album by Blue Rodeo, released in 1989. It was recorded in 1989 at the Donlands theatre in Toronto and mixed at the Kingsway Studio in New Orleans. It is the last Blue Rodeo album to feature original drummer Cleave Anderson and includes several instrumental interludes by Bob Wiseman on the majority of versions. Diamond Mine was the second best-selling Cancon album in Canada in 1989.

The band had decided to work with Malcolm Burn on the album after hearing the album Red Earth by Crash Vegas, which had been formed a year earlier by singer-songwriter Michelle McAdorey and Blue Rodeo member Greg Keelor. They hired Burn in December 1988, and set up a temporary recording studio at the abandoned Donlands theatre in the east end of Toronto for its "roomy acoustics", in part inspired by the acoustics of The Trinity Session by the Cowboy Junkies. The recording was then mixed at the New Orleans studio of Daniel Lanois.

While touring to support the album in 1989, the band's manager John Caton quit abruptly as a result of a heart condition, effectively ending the label Risque Disque as well. The band hired Danny Goldberg as their new manager.

Jim Cuddy states that of all the Blue Rodeo albums, Diamond Mine has the "most honest expression of musical interest". Keelor has stated that in retrospect, the album has a "muddy, confused" sound.

Track listing
Some editions of the album feature the truncated tracklist on the back, but are the full verson.

Chart performance

Awards 
Blue Rodeo won the Juno Award for Group of the Year in 1990 despite neither the album or any song from it being nominated for an award.

Certifications

References

1989 albums
Blue Rodeo albums
Albums produced by Malcolm Burn